Amorbia curitiba is a species of moth of the family Tortricidae. It is found in Paraná, Brazil.

The length of the forewings is 8–8.5 mm for males and 10–11 mm for females. The ground colour of the forewings is light brown, but the median and subterminal fasciae are dark brown. The hindwings are beige.

Etymology
The species name refers to Curitiba, the type locality.

References

Moths described in 2007
Sparganothini
Moths of South America